The 2019 Weber State Wildcats football team represented Weber State University in the 2019 NCAA Division I FCS football season. The Wildcats were led by fifth-year head coach Jay Hill and played their games at Stewart Stadium as members of the Big Sky Conference. They finished the season 11–4, 7–1 in Big Sky play to finish in a two-way tie for the Big Sky championship with Sacramento State. They received the Big Sky's automatic bid to the FCS Playoffs where, after a first round bye, they defeated Kennesaw State in the second round and Montana in the quarterfinals before losing to James Madison in the semifinals.

Previous season

They finished the 2018 season 10–3, 7–1 in Big Sky play to finish in a three-way tie for the Big Sky championship with Eastern Washington and UC Davis. They received the Big Sky's automatic bid to the FCS Playoffs where, after a first round bye, they defeated Southeast Missouri State in the second round before losing in the quarterfinals to Maine.

Preseason

Big Sky preseason poll
The Big Sky released their preseason media and coaches' polls on July 15, 2019. The Wildcats were picked to finish in third place in both polls.

Preseason All–Big Sky team
The Wildcats had seven players selected to the preseason all-Big Sky team, the most of any team in the conference.

Offense

Ty Whitworth – OG

Josh Davis – RB

Defense

Adam Rodriguez – DE

Jonah Williams – DE

Auston Tesch – OLB

Special teams

Trey Tuttle – K

Rashid Shaheed – RS

Schedule

The game against Cal Poly on September 7 was designated as a non-conference game, with no effect on the Big Sky standings.

Game summaries

at San Diego State

Cal Poly

at Nevada

Northern Iowa

at Idaho

Southern Utah

Northern Arizona

at UC Davis

at Sacramento State

North Dakota

at Montana

Idaho State

FCS Playoffs
The Wildcats entered the postseason tournament as the number three seed, with a first-round bye.

Kennesaw State–Second Round

Montana–Quarterfinals

at James Madison–Semifinals

Ranking movements

References

Weber State
Weber State Wildcats football seasons
Big Sky Conference football champion seasons
Weber State
Weber State Wildcats football